KTUM (107.1 FM, "B 107 The Blaze") is an American radio station licensed to serve Tatum, New Mexico, United States. The station, established in 2003, is owned by MTD Radio Inc. and the broadcast license is held by MTD, Inc.  KTUM shares a broadcast tower with sister station KWMW.

KTUM formerly broadcast an active rock music format that originally featured the satellite-fed "The Nerve" service from Citadel Media. Since the network closed in 2013, KTUM was programmed locally while keeping the "Nerve" brand. KTUM now broadcasts a Top 40 (CHR) format.

History

This station received its original construction permit from the Federal Communications Commission on November 6, 2000.  The new station was assigned the KTUM call sign by the FCC on November 20, 2000.  KTUM received its license to cover from the FCC on February 25, 2004.

References

External links
B107 The Blaze website
MTD Radio Inc.

TUM
Radio stations established in 2003
Lea County, New Mexico
Contemporary hit radio stations in the United States
2003 establishments in New Mexico